The molecular formula C9H16N3O14P3 (molar mass: 483.16 g/mol) may refer to:

 Cytidine triphosphate
 Arabinofuranosylcytosine triphosphate